John Beng Kiat Liem (May 17, 1922 in Bukittinggi, Indonesia – June 26, 2001 in Jakarta) served as a member of the Asia-Pacific Scout Committee.
In 1982, he was awarded the 158th Bronze Wolf, the only distinction of the World Organization of the Scout Movement, awarded by the World Scout Committee for exceptional services to world Scouting.
He also being awarded Bintang Jasa Pratama by President of Indonesia for his contribution in Indonesian Scout movement in 1995.

References

External links

Recipients of the Bronze Wolf Award
Indonesian people of Chinese descent
1922 births
2001 deaths
Scouting in Indonesia